Greystones Rugby Football Club is a rugby union team based in  Greystones, County Wicklow in the Republic of Ireland, playing in Division 2B of the All-Ireland League. The club was formed in 1937. They won their first trophy in  
1944 when they won the Metropolitan League  
.

Notable former players

Ireland
The following Greystones players represented Ireland at full international level. 

 Reggie Corrigan
 Tony Doyle
 Paul McNaughton
 John Murphy
 Johnny Murphy
 Nick Popplewell
 Brian Rigney
 John Robbie
 Tony Ward

British and Irish Lions
As well as representing Ireland, several  Greystones players also represented the British and Irish Lions. Both Robbie and Popplewell were attached to Greystones when they represented the Lions. 

 John Robbie: 1980
Tony Ward: 1980
 Nick Popplewell: 1993

Other internationals
  Tom Curtis
  Pieter Muller
  Dylan Fawsitt

Honours

Ulster Bank League Division 2B
Winners : 2016-17:
Metro League Division 7
Winners : 2015-16:
Leinster Senior Shield
Winners : 2015-16:
AIB Division Two
Winners: 2006-07:
AIB Division Three
Winners: 2003-04, 2004-05:  2
Leinster Senior League
Runners Up : 1980:  1
Leinster Club Senior Cup
Runners Up : 1983, 1994, 1995:  3
Metropolitan League
Winners: 1944:  1
Metropolitan Cup
Winners: 1996:  1

References

External links
  www.greystonesrfc.ie
Fansite

Irish rugby union teams
Rugby clubs established in 1937
Rugby union clubs in County Wicklow
Sport in Greystones
Senior Irish rugby clubs (Leinster)
1937 establishments in Ireland